Carabobo is a station on Line A of the Buenos Aires Underground. It is located at the 6300 block of Rivadavia avenue. It is near the Koreatown of Buenos Aires. The station was opened on 23 December 2008 as the western terminus of the extension of the line from Primera Junta. On 27 September 2013 the line was extended to San Pedrito.

See also 
 Carabobo (disambiguation)

References

External links

Buenos Aires Underground stations
Railway stations opened in 2008
2008 establishments in Argentina